Leonid Enik was Minister for Culture of Abkhazia from 2001 until 10 March 2005. He was born in 1960 in the village of Mgudzurkhva in Gudauta District.

On 29 January 2016, Leonid Enik was appointed as the new General Director of the Abkhazian State TV and Radio, succeeding Emma Khojava, who had been dismissed, upon her own request, on 25 January.

During his tenure, Enik was criticised by other journalists, in particular his predecessor Khojava. In October, he announced that he wanted to resign due to ill health, and on 4 November he was replaced by former Education Minister Tali Japua.

References

1960 births
Living people
People from Gudauta District
Ministers for Culture of Abkhazia
Date of birth missing (living people)